The following is a list of football stadiums in Syria sorted by their capacities. The minimum capacity is 1,000.

Future stadiums

See also
List of association football stadiums by capacity

Syria
Stadiums
Football stadiums

Sources